Regragui is a surname. It may refer to:

Places
Sidi Aissa Regragui, a small town and rural commune in Marrakech-Tensift-Al Haouz, Morocco

People
Abdesselem Regragui (born 1939), Moroccan gymnast
Nezha Regragui (born 1957), Moroccan theatre, TV and film actress
Walid Regragui (born 1975), Moroccan footballer and manager